The Santa Rosa Police Department is the police force for Santa Rosa, California. The department has 247 sworn employees.

History
The Santa Rosa Police Department was formed on April 1, 1867, one year before the incorporation of the City of Santa Rosa in 1868. In its first 100 years, the department grew from three "Town Marshals" to a staff of 55.

The next 31 years produced an impressive organizational growth to the present day staff of 247. According to the demographic information provided by the California Department of Finance, from 1987 through 1999, the city's population increased 63%, which is an average annual increase of 3.7% for the past 17 years ending December 31, 1999. From 1998 to 1999, Santa Rosa's population increased by 2%, which is slightly less than the 17 year annual increase.

Famous Cases

Lynchings
On May 9, 1878, Charles Henley, a 57-year-old farmer from Windsor, California, murdered his neighbor James Rowland after Rowland complained about Henley's pigs being loose on his property. Henley left Rowland's body to be eaten by his hogs, and the next day Henley turned himself in to the authorities. In the early morning hours of June 9, groups of men started to appear on the streets of Santa Rosa. One group went to the home of jailer Sylvester Wilson, where the men held his family hostage while Wilson was taken to the jail to hand over the keys to the lynch mob. Wilson and night guard R. Dryer were taken in a wagon and dropped off on the outskirts of Santa Rosa. Henley was found hanging from a tree not far from where the two men were released. The lynchers were never caught.

On December 5, 1920, Santa Rosa native Terry Fitts, along with San Francisco hoodlums "Spanish" Charley Valento and George Boyd, got into a shootout with a joint police squad from Santa Rosa, Sonoma County and the San Francisco Police department. The outlaws were wanted in San Francisco for the gang rape of a young woman. Fitts, Valento, and Boyd were at the home of an acquaintance, looking for food or money, when the police caught up with them. As the police crashed through the door of the home, Boyd shot and killed San Francisco police detective Lester Dohrman, Sergeant Miles Jackson, and Sonoma County Sheriff Jim Petray. The three wanted men were then quickly taken into custody. On December 10, 1920, a group of men entered the jail without a struggle, took the men out of their cell, and drove them to Santa Rosa Rural Cemetery.  They were strung up by their necks in their long underwear and left to swing in the wind. The inquest's verdict was "death by persons unknown". It was rumored that the lynch mob was made up of men from nearby Healdsburg, California who were friends of Sheriff Petray.

Murder of Police Chief O'Neal
On July 15, 1935, disgruntled rancher and hunting guide Al Chamberlain dressed up in his finest cowboy clothes, drove to his former ranch outside of Santa Rosa and shot John McCabe, the new owner of the property, leaving him for dead.  He survived.  Chamberlain drove his beat-up car to Santa Rosa where he walked into the Santa Rosa police station and killed Chief Charlie O'Neal.  Chamberlain had owned a livery stable in downtown Santa Rosa for years, but was forced to vacate his business through eminent domain when the city wanted to build their new city hall on Chamberlain's property.  Chief O'Neal personally signed and served Chamberlain his notice to vacate. Financially broken, Chamberlain had to sell his beloved ranch on Saint Helena Road. O'Neal continued to harass Chamberlain to the point where he got the prosecutor to sentence Chamberlain to thirty days and a hundred-dollar fine for accidentally hitting a pedestrian. He was never the same man after he was released from jail.  After shooting O'Neal, Chamberlain calmly walked down the street with a pistol in each hand, searching for Sonoma County Sheriff Harry Patteson.  Patteson heard the gunshots and bumped into Chamberlain, who did not recognize him.  Patteson disarmed and tackled Chamberlain, with the help of Joe Schurman and Burnette Dibble.  He was sentenced to life in prison and died in San Quentin Prison.

Richard DeSantis
In September 2012, a federal jury in San Francisco awarded $500,000 to the family of Richard DeSantis, a mentally ill unarmed man fatally shot outside his home by Santa Rosa Police on April 11, 2007. The jury found that a Santa Rosa police sergeant violated DeSantis' civil rights. Officers testified at the trial that they did not know DeSantis was unarmed, and used nonlethal rubber bullets to subdue DeSantis before a sergeant used deadly force. The shooting was found justified by the Sonoma County District Attorney's office.

Death of Andy Lopez

On October 22, 2013, 13-year-old Andy Lopez was shot and killed by Sonoma County sheriff's deputy Erick Gelhaus in the Moorland neighborhood of Santa Rosa. Lopez was walking to his friend's house while carrying an airsoft gun replica of an AK-47. Gelhaus mistook the airsoft gun for a real rifle, and demanded that Lopez drop the weapon. Gelhaus then fired eight shots at Lopez, killing him. The shooting prompted protests in Santa Rosa, which attracted protesters from around Northern California. The Lopez family filed a lawsuit at the District Court in November, claiming that Gelhaus shot Lopez "without reasonable cause." They amended their lawsuit in January 2014, claiming that the Sheriff's office had long known that Gelhaus had a "propensity ... to recklessly draw his firearm and to use excessive force". The deputy's attorney argued that Gelhaus "absolutely believed" that the gun was real and that his life was in danger. You may be wondering why this is listed on the Santa Rosa Police Department page, as there is no relation in the above paragraph. The extent of SRPD's involvement was to investigate the incident.

Budget
The budget for Fiscal year 2019-2020 is $59.7 Million dollars, comprising more than one third of the city's entire General Fund Budget.
Santa Rosa has proposed and increase in funding by $2.5 million for the 2020-2021 fiscal year.

Gang task force
The Santa Rosa Police Department formed a gang investigation unit in the late 1980s. That unit was disestablished in 2006 due to budget shortages. SRPD formed the Gang Crime Investigations Team, currently known as the Gang Crimes Team. One of its detectives is assigned to the North Bay Regional Gang Task Force, an FBI-led movement.

References

Santa Rosa, California
Municipal police departments of California